Verin Sznek or Yukhary Yemishjan is a village de facto in the Askeran Province of the breakaway Republic of Artsakh, de jure in the Khojaly District of Azerbaijan, in the disputed region of Nagorno-Karabakh.

History 
During the Soviet period, the village was a part of the Askeran District of the Nagorno-Karabakh Autonomous Oblast.

Historical heritage sites 
Historical heritage sites in and around the village include a cemetery from between the 16th and 19th centuries, the 18th/19th-century church of Surb Astvatsatsin, and a 19th-century spring monument.

Economy and culture 
The population is mainly engaged in agriculture and animal husbandry. As of 2015, the village has a municipal building, a house of culture, a medical centre, and a secondary school that is shared with the neighboring village of Nerkin Sznek.

Demographics 
The village has an ethnic Armenian-majority population, had 28 inhabitants in 2005, and 33 inhabitants in 2015.

References

External links 
 
 

Populated places in Askeran Province
Populated places in Khojaly District